Jane Unrue is an American writer and educator. She was born in Columbus, Ohio, grew up in Las Vegas, Nevada, and graduated from the University of Illinois at Urbana-Champaign (B.A.) and Brown University (M.F.A.). She has taught at Emerson College, Boston College, and Wellesley College, and currently teaches at Harvard University, where she directs the Harvard Scholars at Risk (SAR) Program and chairs the Freedom to Write Committee board for PEN New England.

Selected works 
 Love Hotel: (novel), New Directions, Feb. 2015
 Life of a Star (short novel); Burning Deck Press, spring ’10 
 Dear Mr. Erker (short novel): 3rd bed, No. 11
 Atlassed (collection): Triple Press, ’05
 “Looking Sideways”: unsaid, vol.1, no. 1
 “Happiness/Sadness Patterns”: 5_trope (webdelsol.com/5_trope), March ’05
 “Hands Reaching out of a Black Background”: 3rd bed, fall/winter ’04
 “A New Position for the Upper Lip”: diagram (thediagram.com), 3.5
 “Passion (Asleep)”: 5_trope, June ’03
 “Changes in the Upper Face”: del sol review       (webdelsol.com/Del_Sol_Review.com), summer ’03
 “November”; “India”; “Lima”; “Quebec”: The Denver Quarterly, fall ’01
 “Seven Favorite Dog Stories”: “Detector of Narcotics, Explosives”; “Performers on Stage or Screen (Pre-Frenzy)”;      “Carrier of Messages”; “Adapted to Life in City and Country”;       “Antidotes, Inoculations”; “Trotter”; “Watcher, Guarder”: Fence, Vol. 4, No. 1
 The House (short novel): Burning Deck Press, ’00
 “Child, Bird, Box”: Iowa Review Web 
 “Surviving the Flood”: Cimarron Review, Vol. 119

Texts 
Echo
the mouth: ‘i’d be ashamed’; the eyes: ‘when shall we meet again?' 
A New Position for the Lower Lip
Passion (Asleep)

References

Living people
21st-century American poets
21st-century American women writers
Writers from Columbus, Ohio
Writers from Las Vegas
Poets from Ohio
Poets from Nevada
University of Illinois Urbana-Champaign alumni
Brown University alumni
Emerson College faculty
Boston College faculty
Wellesley College faculty
Harvard University faculty
Year of birth missing (living people)
American women academics